Independent Civic Union (in Spanish: Unión Cívica Independiente), was a political party in Peru founded in 1988 by Francisco Diez Canseco Távara and César Larrabure. UCI contested the parliamentary elections of 1990. Later it dissolved itself.

Defunct political parties in Peru
Political parties established in 1988
Political parties with year of disestablishment missing